Acmispon maritimus, synonym Lotus salsuginosus, is a species of legume native to Arizona, California and northwestern Mexico. It is known by the common name coastal bird's-foot trefoil. It grows in many types of mountain, desert, and scrub habitat, not necessarily near the coast. It is an annual herb quite variable in morphology, from petite to bushy, hairless to roughly hairy, and prostrate to erect in form. The slender stems are lined with leaves each made up of pairs of leaflets variable in shape and size. The inflorescence is a small array of 1 to 4 yellow flowers, each up to a centimeter long or so. The elongated flower corolla emerges from a tubular calyx of sepals. The fruit is a legume pod up to 3 centimeters long. Laboratory studies have shown this species, which occurs in wildfire-prone habitat such as chaparral, to have an increased rate of seed germination after exposure to heat.

References

External links
 Jepson Manual Treatment
 USDA Plants Profile
 Acmispon maritimus at CalFlora. Accessed 4/27/2020
 Acmispon maritimus var. brevivexillus at CalFLora
 Acmispon maritimus photo gallery at Cal Photos

maritimus
Flora of Arizona
Flora of California
Flora of Northwestern Mexico
Flora without expected TNC conservation status